Bela trinacria is an extinct species of sea snail, a marine gastropod mollusk in the family Mangeliidae.

Description
The height of the shell attains 8.5 mm, its diameter 3.5 mm.

Distribution
Fossils of this species have been found in Pliocene strata in Sicily, Italy.

References

External links

trinacria
Gastropods described in 2009